The Egyptian Umma Party or Egyptian Nation Party was a political party in Egypt, founded by supporters of presidential candidate Hazem Salah Abu Ismail in 2012. Abu Ismail himself has, however, not joined the party itself. Abu Ismail announced on 17 December 2012 that the party would compete for all of the seats in the 2013 parliamentary election. The party is one of a network of three parties. The name of the party was changed to the Flag Party in 2013.

References

2012 establishments in Egypt
2013 disestablishments in Egypt
Defunct political parties in Egypt
Islamic political parties in Egypt
Political parties disestablished in 2013
Political parties established in 2012
Salafi groups